Stevenson Nathaniel Garrison (born September 12, 1986) is an American former professional baseball pitcher. He played in Major League Baseball for the New York Yankees in 2011.

Garrison grew up in Ewing Township, New Jersey and attended The Hun School of Princeton in Princeton, New Jersey.

Minor and Major League career
Garrison was selected by the Milwaukee Brewers in the 10th round (295th overall) of the 2005 Major League Baseball Draft. On July 25, 2007, he was traded to the Padres with Will Inman and Joe Thatcher for Scott Linebrink. He was promoted as high as Triple-A, where he played for the Portland Beavers.  On September 6, 2010, he was designated for assignment.

On September 9, 2010, Garrison was claimed off waivers by the New York Yankees.  He joined the Double-A Trenton Thunder for the 2010 Eastern League playoffs.

He was called up by the Yankees for the first time on July 19, 2011. Garrison made his major league debut on July 25, 2011, against the Seattle Mariners, recording the last 2 outs in a 10–3 Yankees win. He was designated for assignment on September 11, 2011 and became a minor league free agent after the season.

The Seattle Mariners signed Garrison to a minor league contract on November 22, 2011.

He signed a minor league contract with the Arizona Diamondbacks in December 2012 and with the Baltimore Orioles in February 2014.

Independent baseball
Garrison played with the Long Island Ducks for part of the 2014 season before being released. In 2015, Garrison signed with the Camden Riversharks.

He became a free agent after the 2015 season.

References

External links

1986 births
Living people
New York Yankees players
Baseball players from Trenton, New Jersey
Hun School of Princeton alumni
Major League Baseball pitchers
People from Ewing Township, New Jersey
Sportspeople from Mercer County, New Jersey
Arizona League Brewers players
West Virginia Power players
Brevard County Manatees players
Lake Elsinore Storm players
San Antonio Missions players
Arizona League Padres players
Portland Beavers players
Long Island Ducks players
Trenton Thunder players
Staten Island Yankees players
Jackson Generals (Southern League) players
Tacoma Rainiers players
Mobile BayBears players
Peoria Saguaros players
Camden Riversharks players